Rimantas Vaitkus is the First Deputy Chancellor of the Government of Lithuania.

References 

Chancellors of Lithuania
Living people
Place of birth missing (living people)
Year of birth missing (living people)